The 2013 Rallye International du Valais was the twelfth and final round of the 2013 European Rally Championship season, held in Switzerland between 7–9 November 2013.

Results

References

2013 in Swiss sport
2013 European Rally Championship season